Smithers Airport  is  north of Smithers, British Columbia, Canada.

History
A Yukon Airways and Exploration landing at Sproule's Ranch in 1928 was the first airplane arrival in the vicinity. This field was used for several years.

In 1929, the Board of Trade purchased the Ed Hill Ranch a few miles south of Smithers, calling it the Smithers Aviation Park, comprising a  runway. With financial assistance from the Department of National Defence, the project was completed in 1933. Owing to size limitations, the Department of National Defence rebuilt at the present location in 1942.

After the war, the airport transferred to civilian use. The Department of Transport transferred airport ownership to the town in 1999.

Completed in 2018, phase one of a four-phase terminal expansion increased energy efficiency and provided a 150-passenger lounge.
Formerly with a 54-seating capacity, later phases of the $8m project will increase building space.

As of 2020, runway data are as follows:

NavCanada

NavCanada operates a Flight Service Station at Smithers Airport. Staffed hours of operations were cut on April 8, 2010 from 24 hours a day to 13 hours in the winter and 16 hours in the summer.

Manned hours of operation:
June 1 - September 30, 1300-0500 UTC
October 1 - May 31, 1500-0400 UTC (1400-0300 UTC during daylight saving time)

Airlines and destinations

See also
Smithers/Tyhee Lake Water Aerodrome

Footnotes

References

External links

 Smithers Airport

Certified airports in British Columbia
Regional District of Bulkley-Nechako
Smithers, British Columbia
Royal Canadian Air Force stations
Military airbases in British Columbia
Military history of British Columbia
Airports established in 1933
1933 establishments in British Columbia